Thrissur (formerly Trichur),  is one of the 14 districts in the Indian state of Kerala. It is situated in the central part the state.

Thrissur district is bordered by the districts of Palakkad and Malappuram to the north, and the district of Ernakulam to the south and Coimbatore to the east. The Arabian Sea lies to the west and Western Ghats stretches towards the east.  It is part of the historical Malabar Coast, which has been trading internationally since ancient times.  The main language spoken is Malayalam.

Thrissur district was formed on 1 July 1949, with the headquarters at Thrissur City. Thrissur is known as the cultural capital of Kerala, and the land of Poorams. The district is known for its ancient temples, churches, and mosques. Thrissur Pooram is the most colourful temple festival in Kerala.

Etymology 
The term Thrissur is the abbreviated form of the word "Thrissivaperur" which means the town of the 'Sacred Siva'. The town is built on an elevated ground, at the apex of which is the famous 'Vadakkumnatha Temple'. A place of great antiquity, Thrissur was also known as 'Vrishabhadripuram' and 'Ten Kailasam' in ancient days.
Thrissur interpretation is 'Tri-shiva-peroor' or the big land with three Shiva temples, which refers to the three places where Lord Shiva resides – namely Vadakkunnathan temple, Asokeswaram Siva temple and Irattachira Siva temple.

History 

From ancient times, Thrissur District has played a part in the political history of Kerala.The early political history of the District is interlinked with that of the Cheras of the Sangam age, who ruled over vast portions of Kerala with their capital at Vanchi. The whole of the present Thrissur District was included in the early Chera Empire. The District can claim to have played a part in fostering the trade relations between Kerala and the outside world in the ancient and medieval period.

Kodungalloor, which had the distinction of being the "Premium Emporium of India", gave shelter to all the three communities which have contributed to the prosperity of Malabar. These three communities are the Christians, the Jews and the Muslims. The history of Thrissur district from the 9th to the 12th centuries is the history of Kulasekharas of Mahodayapuram and the history since the 12th century is the history of the rise and growth of Perumpadappu Swarupam.

In 1790 Raja Rama Varma (1790–1805) popularly known as Saktan Tampuran ascended the throne of Cochin. With the accession of this ruler the English or modern period in the history of Cochin and of the District began. Saktan Tampuran was mainly responsible for the destruction of the power of the feudal Nair chieftains and increase of royal power. Another force in the public life of Trichur and its suburbs was the Namboodithiri community and Menons of royal ancestry. A large part of the Trichur Taluk was for long under the domination of the Yogiatiripppads, the ecclesiastical heads of the Vadakkunnathan and Perumanam Devaswoms.

The wave of nationalism and political consciousness which swept through the country since the early decades of this century has its repercussions in the District as well. Thrissur District has been in the forefront of the country-wide movement for temple entry and abolition of untouchability. The Guruvayur Satyagraha is a memorable episode in the history of the national movement.

Demographics 

Source: Official Statistics 2007

According to the 2018 Statistics Report, Thrissur district has a population of 3,243,170, roughly equal to the nation of Mongolia or the US state of Iowa. The 2011 Census of India gives it a ranking of 113th in India (out of a total of 640). Its population growth rate over the decade 2001–2011 was  4.58%. Thrissur has a sex ratio of  1107 females for every 1000 males, and a literacy rate of 95.32%. Scheduled Castes and Scheduled Tribes make up 10.39% and 0.30% of the population respectively. Thrissur was also the second highest urbanized district in Kerala after Ernakulam.

Malayalam is the predominant language, spoken by 98.91% of the population as of 2011.

Religion 

Hinduism is the majority religion in Trissur, with 58.4% of the population. Christians and Muslims form significant minority.

Hindus 
The Hindu community consists of mainly Nairs, Thiyyas, Ambalavasis, Brahmins (including the local Namboodiris and migrants like Iyers and Gouda Saraswat Brahmins) etc. The Scheduled Castes, around 12% of the population of the district, also form a section among the Hindus of the district.

Guruvayur Temple is a Hindu shrine dedicated to the Lord Guruvayurappan, located in the town of Guruvayur in Kerala, India. It is one of the most important pilgrim centres for Hindus in South India.

Christians 
The Catholics (Syro Malabar Church and Latin), Orthodox and Chaldeans are the main sections of the Christian Community in the district. Catholics constitute 90% of the Christian population of the district. Kunnamkulam, a town in the northern part of the district is the center for the Orthodox, Thoziyur Church and Marthomites. A notable church in the area is St. Thomas Syro-Malabar Church, Palayur.

According to Saint Thomas christian tradition, the Palayur church was established in 52 AD by Saint Thomas, one of the twelve apostles of Jesus Christ. It is the first church in India , and Saint Thomas performed the first baptism in India here.  It is part of the Ēḻarappaḷḷikaḷ (seven major churches) that he established in India. The original small church structure has been retained at the original site.

Muslims 
Muslims live predominantly in the coastal belt of the district, from north Punnayoorkkulam to South Azhikode. They are dominant in Guruvayur and Chavakkad, in good in numbers Kodungalloor, Kaipamangalam and Nattika areas Sunnis are the major section in Muslim community.

The first mosque in India is claimed to be Cheraman Juma Mosque in Kodungallur. Legend claims that it was built in 629 CE, which makes it the oldest mosque in the Indian subcontinent which is still in use. It was built by Malik Deenar, Persian tābiʿūn of the Islamic prophet Muhammad, on the orders of the successor of Cheraman Perumal, the Chera King of modern-day Kerala. The mosque was constructed in Kerala style with hanging lamps.

Geography and climate 

Thrissur is situated in southwestern India and is in the central part of Kerala. It is bounded on the north by small parts of Malappuram district, on the east and north by Palakkad district, on the east by small parts of Coimbatore district of Tamil Nadu, on the south by Ernakulam district, and on the west by the Arabian Sea. Descending from the heights of the Western Ghats in the east, the land slopes towards the west forming three distinct natural divisions – the highlands, the plains and the sea board. Karimala Gopuram is the highest point in Trissur situated in the border of Parambikulam Wildlife Sanctuary of Palakkad.

The Periyar, the Chalakudy, the Karuvannur, the Kurumali River (main tributary of the Karuvannur River) and the Ponnani (Bharatha Puzha) are the main river systems in the district. They take their origin from the mountains on the east, and flow westward and discharge into the Arabian Sea. There are a number of tributaries also joining these main rivers. There are waterfalls such as Athirappilly Falls which is widely known as the "Indian Niagara" nowadays. This is the only district in Kerala with the presence of both Periyar and Bharathappuzha, though they flow only a small distance through the district.

The district has a tropical humid climate with an oppressive hot season and plentiful and seasonal rainfall. The hot season from March to May is followed by the South West Monsoon season from June to September. The period from December to February is the North East Monsoon season. However the rain stops by the end of December and the rest of the period is generally dry.

Culture 

Thrissur is known as cultural capital of Kerala.The district is known for the Thrissur Pooram.
An ancient cultural center, Thrissur houses the Kerala Kalamandalam, the Kerala Sahitya Academy, the Kerala Lalitakala Academy and the Kerala Sangeeta Nataka Academy.The town is built around a hillock, crowned by the Vadakkumnathan (Siva) Temple. The temple is a classical example of Kerala style of architecture and houses several sacred shrines.

Thrissur also has added to its name The Church of Our Lady of Dolors, popularly known as the New Church(Puthen Palli). It is the third tallest church in Asia and the tallest in India. The first two churchs of India is also situated in Thrissur, the St. Thomas Syro-Malabar Church, Palayoor and the Marthoma Pontifical Shrine, Kodungallur . The Metropolitan of the Chaldean Syrian Church (the name used for the Church of the East in India) is also headquartered in Thrissur, and many religious publications are printed by Mar Narsai Press. The largest Christian pilgrim center in the district, St.Joseph's Shrine is situated at Pavaratty.
There is a legend which tells Saint Thomas (Apostle) was landed in kodungallur, Muziris in 52 AD. The Saint Thomas Church established by him houses many ancient relics. Puthenchira in Thrissur is the birth place of the Catholic Saint Mariam Thresia.

According to myth, Malik Bin Deenar and 20 others who were the followers Muhammad, the founder of Islam, first landed in Kodungallur in Thrissur district when they came to India. Islam received royal patronage in some places here, and later spread to other parts of India. He built the mosque Cheraman Juma Masjid which makes it the first mosque in India

It is a sacred place not only for Keralites but for Hindus all over the world as well. The adjacent towns of Chavakkad and Kunnamkulam are important centers of Muslims and Christians respectively. The Temple at Thriprayar is another important place of worship. This ancient temple is one of the few Temples dedicated to Lord Srirama in Kerala. Incidentally, two other temples dedicated to Lord Rama, viz., the Thiruvilwamala Temple and the Kadavallur Temple, fall in Thrissur district. Thirumangalam Temple situated at Thirumangalam desam, Engandiyur, Thrissur District. The Temple facing to Gurvayur Ernakulam National Highway. In this temple, there are two idols, one is Siva and the other is Maha Vishnu. Both have same the importance. But Siva is the main Idol. Because of this the temple listed in the 108 Siva temples list. The temple faces to the eastern side and has very good Sreekovil.

Kodungallur, the capital of the erstwhile Chera Empire, is a region of great archeological and historical significance. The Bhagavathi Temple here attracts thousands of devotees from all over Kerala. The Cheraman Juma Masjid, believed to be the oldest Mosque in India is situated here. Irinjalakkuda, where the only Bharatha Temple in India is located, is another place of importance. The Unnayi Warrier Smaraka Kalanilayam which is located near the Koodalmanickyam Temple is an important center of Kathakali Learning. Since ancient times Thrissur has been the most important center of Vedic Learning in Kerala. Yagas are still conducted in her soil with the same fervour as they used to be. The only centre of traditional Vedic Learning left in Kerala is situated at the heart of Thrissur Town.

Education

Administration of Thrissur 

The district is divided into two Revenue Sub Divisions; Thrissur and Irinjalakuda and is headed by Revenue Divisional Officer (RDO)
Taluks under Thrissur Revenue Division: Thrissur, Chavakkad, Talappilly, Kunnamkulam
Taluks under Irinjalakuda Revenue Division: Mukundapuram, Chalakudy, Kodungallur
Thrissur District has four types of administrative hierarchies:
 Taluk and Village administration managed by the state government of Kerala
 Panchayath Administration managed by the local bodies
 Parliament Constituencies for the union government of India
 Assembly Constituencies for the state government of Kerala

There are 13 constituencies from the district of Thrissur: Thrissur Assembly Constituency, Ollur Assembly Constituency, Guruvayoor, Chalakkudy, Kaipamangalam, Nattika, Kodungallur, Irinjalakuda, Puthukad, Manaloor, Kunnamkulam, Wadakkancheri and Chelakkara. There are two parliament constituencies: Thrissur Lok Sabha constituency and Chalakudy. T. N. Prathapan is the Thrissur MP and Benny Behanan is the Chalakudy MP. Thrissur municipal corporation is the only municipal corporation in the district. For administrative purposes, the district of Thrissur is divided into two Revenue Divisions and seven taluks. These seven taluk centres are administrative hubs for 255 villages in Thrissur.

Media 
The first newspaper which published from Thrissur was Lokamanyan in 1920. Then came Deenabandhu in 1941 and General (newspaper) in 1976. Major Malayalam newspapers published in Thrissur include ''Malayala Manorama, Mathrubhumi, Deshabhimani, Deepika, Kerala Kaumudi and Madhyamam. A number of evening papers are also published from the city. Newspapers in other regional languages like Hindi, Kannada, Tamil and Telugu are also sold in large numbers.

Politics

Industries 

Thrissur is known for the power loom industry and the Textile Mills like the Alagappa Textiles in Alagappa Nagar, Kerala Lakshmi Mills at Pullazhi, Rajgopal Textiles at Athani, Sitaram Spinning and Weaving Mills Thrissur, Vanaja Textiles at Kurichikkara (now defunct), Bhagavathy Spinning Mills at Thanikkudam and Kunnath Textiles at Thrissur. Thrissur are engaged in the manufacture of hosiery products.

The coir and the tile industry offer employment for many people in the district. The first saw mill in the state was erected at Trichur (1905). Most of the timber is brought down from the forests to Thrissur and Chalakkudy, which are the most important timber marts in the District. Canning  is a developing industry in Thrissur and Darlco Cannings and Kayee Plantations Cannings;  both have major units at Thrissur. The Thrissur Fruits and Vegetables Marketing Society are establishing a canning industrial unit at Nadathara and it is going on very successfully. Besides all these the match stick industry, pharmaceuticals, printing etc. give Thrissur its fame as a bustling industrial centre. The first Worker's Indian Coffee House of the state was opened in Thrissur (1957).

The 400 kV Electric Power Station at Madakkathara near Thanikkudam is the major electrical hub connecting the KSEB electrical power system to the national electrical grid. The station serves more than 30% of the state's electrical energy requirements and acts as the principal feed to the northern half of Kerala.

Avinissery, a census town at south of Thrissur city is an important centre of Khadi and Village Industries.

Places of interest 

 Athirapilly Water Falls   ( from Thrissur City): This 80 feet high waterfall at the threshold of the Sholayar ranges is a picnic spot. Two amusement parks – DreamWorld and SilverStorm – are located nearby.
 Vazhachal  : Just a short drive from Athirapilly is close to dense forests and a part of the Chalakudy river.
 Chalakudy River : This Perennial River is the 5th Longest river in Kerala and the richest river in fish diversity perhaps in India. 
 Punnathur Kotta Elephant Sanctuary ( from city): It is the largest elephant park in the world, with over 60 elephants.
 Peechi Dam: ( from city) It is a good picnic spot. The dam was started as an irrigation project for the surrounding villages in Thrissur. At the same time, it catered the drinking water needs of the population of Thrissur City. It serves as an irrigation dam, reaching out to the paddy fields in and around Thrissur city. Built across the Manali River. Elephants may be seen on the bank of Peechi-Vazhani Wildlife Sanctuary, established in 1958 covering 125 square kilometres (48 sq mi).
 Poomala Dam: A natural reserve and tourist spot with an irrigation dam.
 Chavakkad Beach
 Vazhani Dam ( from city): It is a good picnic spot
 Chimmony dam  ( from city)
 Kerala Kalamandalam: It is in Cheruthuruthy and was founded by the Poet Sri. Vallathol Narayana Menon, to encourage the study of the ancient arts of Kerala such as Kathakali and Mohiniyattom.
 Koodalmanikyam Temple
 Thrissur Zoo & Museum: Opened in 1885, it is a  big zoo. The zoo is home for various animals, reptiles and birds.

Important towns 

 Kunnamkulam
Cherpu
 Chalakudy
 Chavakkad
 Chelakkara
 Guruvayoor
 Irinjalakuda
 Kodungallur
 Wadakanchery

List of villages

Gallery

Notes

Further reading

External links 

 Government Portal
 Satellite image of Thrissur
 Website of Thrissur Police

 
Districts of Kerala
1949 establishments in India